The history of the Ruby programming language began when Yukihiro Matsumoto first conceived of the language in 1993, then released it in 1995. Annual releases of the language often take place on Christmas Day. Interest in the language surged around 2005 because of the Ruby on Rails framework.

Conception 

Ruby creator Yukihiro Matsumoto has said that Ruby was conceived in 1993. In a 1999 post to the ruby-talk mailing list, he describes some of his early ideas about the language:

Matsumoto describes the design of Ruby as being like a simple Lisp language at its core, with an object system like that of Smalltalk, blocks inspired by higher-order functions, and practical utility like that of Perl.

The name "Ruby" originated during an online chat session between Matsumoto and Keiju Ishitsuka on February 24, 1993, before any code had been written for the language. Initially two names were proposed: "Coral" and "Ruby". Matsumoto chose the latter in a later e-mail to Ishitsuka. Matsumoto later noted a factor in choosing the name "Ruby" – it was the birthstone of one of his colleagues.

First publication 

The first public release of Ruby 0.95 was announced on Japanese domestic newsgroups on December 21, 1995. Subsequently, three more versions of Ruby were released in two days. The release coincided with the launch of the Japanese-language ruby-list mailing list, which was the first mailing list for the new language.

Already present at this stage of development were many of the features familiar in later releases of Ruby, including object-oriented design, classes with inheritance, mixins, iterators, closures, exception handling and garbage collection.

Early releases 

Following the release of Ruby 0.95 in 1995, several stable versions of Ruby were released in the following years:
 Ruby 1.0: December 25, 1996
 Ruby 1.2: December 1998
 Ruby 1.4: August 1999
 Ruby 1.6: September 2000

In 1997, the first article about Ruby was published on the Web. In the same year, Matsumoto was hired by netlab.jp to work on Ruby as a full-time developer.

In 1998, the Ruby Application Archive was launched by Matsumoto, along with a simple English-language homepage for Ruby.

In 1999, the first English language mailing list ruby-talk began, which signaled a growing interest in the language outside Japan. In this same year, Matsumoto and Keiju Ishitsuka wrote the first book on Ruby, The Object-oriented Scripting Language Ruby (オブジェクト指向スクリプト言語 Ruby), which was published in Japan in October 1999. It would be followed in the early 2000s by around 20 books on Ruby published in Japanese.

By 2000, Ruby was more popular than Python in Japan. In September 2000, the first English language book Programming Ruby was printed, which was later freely released to the public, further widening the adoption of Ruby amongst English speakers. In early 2002, the English-language ruby-talk mailing list was receiving more messages than the Japanese-language ruby-list, demonstrating Ruby's increasing popularity in the non-Japanese speaking world.

Ruby 1.8 

Ruby 1.8 was initially released August 2003, was stable for a long time, and was retired June 2013. Although deprecated, there is still code based on it. Ruby 1.8 is only partially compatible with Ruby 1.9.

Ruby 1.8 has been the subject of several industry standards. The language specifications for Ruby were developed by the Open Standards Promotion Center of the Information-Technology Promotion Agency (a Japanese government agency) for submission to the Japanese Industrial Standards Committee (JISC) and then to the International Organization for Standardization (ISO). It was accepted as a Japanese Industrial Standard (JIS X 3017) in 2011 and an international standard (ISO/IEC 30170) in 2012.

Around 2005, interest in the Ruby language surged in tandem with Ruby on Rails, a web framework written in Ruby. Rails is frequently credited with increasing awareness of Ruby.

Ruby 1.9 

Ruby 1.9 was released on Christmas Day in 2007. Effective with Ruby 1.9.3, released October 31, 2011, Ruby switched from being dual-licensed under the Ruby License and the GPL to being dual-licensed under the Ruby License and the two-clause BSD license. Adoption of 1.9 was slowed by changes from 1.8 that required many popular third party gems to be rewritten.

Ruby 1.9 introduces many significant changes over the 1.8 series. Examples include:

 block local variables (variables that are local to the block in which they are declared)
 an additional lambda syntax: 
 an additional Hash literal syntax using colons for symbol keys: 
 per-string character encodings are supported
 new socket API (IPv6 support)
 require_relative import security

Ruby 1.9 has been obsolete since February 23, 2015, and it will no longer receive bug and security fixes. Users are advised to upgrade to a more recent version.

Ruby 2.0 

Ruby 2.0 added several new features, including:
 method keyword arguments,
 a new method, Module#prepend, for extending a class,
 a new literal for creating an array of symbols,
 new API for the lazy evaluation of Enumerables, and
 a new convention of using #to_h to convert objects to Hashes.

Ruby 2.0 was intended to be fully backward compatible with Ruby 1.9.3. As of the official 2.0.0 release on February 24, 2013, there were only five known (minor) incompatibilities.

Ruby 2.0 has been obsolete since February 24, 2016, and it will no longer receive bug and security fixes. Users are advised to upgrade to a more recent version.

Ruby 2.1 

Ruby 2.1.0 was released on Christmas Day in 2013. The release includes speed-ups, bugfixes, and library updates.

Starting with 2.1.0, Ruby's versioning policy is more like semantic versioning. Although similar, Ruby's versioning policy is not compatible with semantic versioning:

Semantic versioning also provides additional labels for pre-release and build metadata are available as extensions to the MAJOR.MINOR.PATCH format, not available at Ruby.

Ruby 2.1 has been obsolete since April 1, 2017, and it will no longer receive bug and security fixes. Users are advised to upgrade to a more recent version.

Ruby 2.2 

Ruby 2.2.0 was released on Christmas Day in 2014. The release includes speed-ups, bugfixes, and library updates and removes some deprecated APIs. Most notably, Ruby 2.2.0 introduces changes to memory handling an incremental garbage collector, support for garbage collection of symbols and the option to compile directly against jemalloc. It also contains experimental support for using vfork(2) with system() and spawn(), and added support for the Unicode 7.0 specification.

Features that were made obsolete or removed include callcc, the DL library, Digest::HMAC, lib/rational.rb, lib/complex.rb, GServer, Logger::Application as well as various C API functions.

Ruby 2.2 has been obsolete since April 1, 2018, and it will no longer receive bug and security fixes. Users are advised to upgrade to a more recent version.

PowerPC64 performance Since version 2.2.1, Ruby MRI performance on PowerPC64 was improved.

Ruby 2.3 

Ruby 2.3.0 was released on Christmas Day in 2015. A few notable changes include:

 The ability to mark all string literals as frozen by default with a consequently large performance increase in string operations.
 Hash comparison to allow direct checking of key/value pairs instead of just keys.
 The did_you_mean gem is now bundled by default and required on startup to automatically suggest similar name matches on a NameError or NoMethodError.
 Hash#dig and Array#dig to easily extract deeply nested values (e.g. given , the value Foo Baz can now be retrieved by profile.dig(:social, :wikipedia, :name)).
 .grep_v(regexp) which will match all negative examples of a given regular expression in addition to other new features.

The 2.3 branch also includes many performance improvements, updates, and bugfixes including changes to Proc#call, Socket and IO use of exception keywords, Thread#name handling, default passive Net::FTP connections, and Rake being removed from stdlib.

Ruby 2.4 

Ruby 2.4.0 was released on Christmas Day in 2016. A few notable changes include:

 Binding#irb: Start a REPL session similar to binding.pry
 Unify Fixnum and Bignum into Integer class
 String supports Unicode case mappings, not just ASCII
 A new method, Regexp#match?, which is a faster boolean version of Regexp#match
 Thread deadlock detection now shows threads with their backtrace and dependency

The 2.4 branch also includes performance improvements to hash table, Array#max, Array#min, and instance variable access.

Ruby 2.5 

Ruby 2.5.0 was released on Christmas Day in 2017. A few notable changes include:

 rescue and ensure statements automatically use a surrounding do-end block (less need for extra begin-end blocks)
 Method-chaining with yield_self
 Support branch coverage and method coverage measurement
 Easier Hash transformations with Hash#slice and Hash#transform_keys

On top of that come a lot of performance improvements like faster block passing (3 times faster), faster Mutexes, faster ERB templates and improvements on some concatenation methods.

Ruby 2.6 

Ruby 2.6.0 was released on Christmas Day in 2018. A few notable changes include:

 JIT (experimental)
 RubyVM::AbstractSyntaxTree (experimental)

Ruby 2.7 

Ruby 2.7.0 was released on Christmas Day in 2019. A few notable changes include:
 Pattern Matching (experimental)
 REPL improvement
 Compaction GC
 Separation of positional and keyword arguments

Ruby 3.0 

Ruby 3.0.0 was released on Christmas Day in 2020.
It is known as Ruby 3x3. One of its main aims was to switch the interpreter to a Just-In-Time Compiler, to make programs faster.

Ruby 3.1 

Version 3.1.0 was released on Christmas of 2021. It included an autocomplete feature.

Ruby 3.2 

Ruby 3.2.0 was released on Christmas Day of 2022. It includes support for WebAssembly.

Table of versions

References 

Ruby (programming language)
Programming languages created in the 1990s